"Silvery Rain" is a song composed by Hank Marvin and first released by Marvin, Welch & Farrar on their eponymous debut album in February 1971. It was also recorded by Cliff Richard, who released it as a single in March 1971. His version peaked at number 27 on the UK Singles Chart.

Cliff Richard version

Release 
"Silvery Rain" was released with two B-sides. The first, "Annabella Umbrella", was written by Valerie Avon and Harold Spiro and features an accompaniment by the Nick Ingam Orchestra. The second, "Time Flies", was written by Brian Bennett and Mike Hawker.

"Silvery Rain" has been described as a being a "social comment on the problems of pesticides and poisons". Derek Johnson for New Musical Express described it as "one of the least commercial and uncharacteristic he has ever recorded".

Track listing 
7": Columbia / DB 8774
 "Silvery Rain" – 3:46
 "Annabella Umbrella" – 2:49
 "Time Flies" – 2:54

Personnel 
 Cliff Richard – vocals
 Big Jim Sullivan – guitar
 Brian Bennett Orchestra – all other instrumentation

Charts

Other versions 
 In 1981, Australian singer Olivia Newton-John covered "Silvery Rain" on her 1981 album Physical, and also released an accompanying music video for the song.

References

Cliff Richard songs
1971 singles
1971 songs
Songs written by Hank Marvin
Columbia Graphophone Company singles
Song recordings produced by Norrie Paramor